Lutsu is a settlement in Valga Parish, Valga County in southeastern Estonia.

References

Villages in Valga County